Dania University College (DUC) is one of the oldest colleges in Bangladesh. It is located at Jatrabari, Dhaka. It offers graduation course in majors and Higher Secondary (School) Certificate (HSC) under Dhaka Board. The college is affiliated with the National University.

Departments
 HSC (Science Discipline),(Business Studies Discipline),(Arts Discipline).
 B.B.A Professional ( 4 years)
 Bachelor of Honors Courses (Duration : 4 Years)
 English Departments(Under National University)
 Bengali Departments(Under National University)
 Finance Departments(Under National University)
 Accounting Departments(Under National University)
 Management Departments(Under National University)
 Marketing Departments(Under National University)
 Political Science Departments(Under National University)
 Islamic Studies Departments(Under National University)
 Islamic History Departments(Under National University)
 Geography Departments(Under National University)

See also
 National University

References

Colleges in Dhaka District
Universities and colleges in Dhaka
Private colleges in Bangladesh